Hesperocosa is a genus of spiders in the family Lycosidae. It was first described in 1937 by Gertsch & Wallace. , it contains only one species, Hesperocosa unica, found in the United States.

References

Lycosidae
Monotypic Araneomorphae genera
Spiders of the United States